"Me Pregunto" (I Wonder) is the first single from the album Dulce Beat, the second studio album by the Mexican band Belanova. The song was released to Mexican radio in May 2005 by Universal Music.

The track hit number thirty-three on Hot Latin Tracks on the Billboard Charts in the United States, becoming the band's biggest international hit to date. When "Dulce Beat Live" was released a live version of the song was certified 2× Platinum for sales of 200,000 units in a pre-loaded format. A pre-loaded bundle of audio and video tracks, including "Baila Mi Corazón", "Rock Star", "Vestida de Azul" and "Me Pregunto" was also certified Platinum for additional 100,000 units sold.

Music video

The accompanying video for the single was directed by Ricardo Calderon and was filmed in Mexico City. The video premiered on MTV on June 13, 2005 and reached number one on MTV's "Los 10 + Pedidos", VH1's Top 20, Telehit's Top Ten and TV Azteca's Top Ten. The single also enjoyed international success.

Track List Maxi Single - Promo CD
Me Pregunto - 3:06
Me Pregunto (Mijangos Classic House Mix) - 7:45
Me Pregunto (Mijangos Classic House Mix Radio Edit) - 4:03
Me Pregunto (Capellas) - 4:54
Enhanced Part:
 Me Pregunto (Music Video)
 EPK (Interview)

Charts

Certifications

References

2005 singles
Belanova songs
Spanish-language songs
Songs written by Denisse Guerrero
Songs written by Edgar Huerta
Songs written by Ricardo Arreola